David Pašek (born 27 October 1989 in Brno) is a Czech football player who currently plays for Líšeň.

References

External links
 
 

1989 births
Living people
Czech footballers
Czech First League players
Cypriot First Division players
FC Zbrojovka Brno players
Karmiotissa FC players
MFK Vítkovice players
1. SK Prostějov players
Expatriate footballers in Cyprus
Footballers from Brno
Association football defenders
SK Líšeň players
Czech National Football League players